Charles Pole (baptised 6 September 1695; died October 1779) was an English slave trader, insurer and Member of Parliament, the fifth son of Samuel Pole of Radbourne Hall.

He was elected to Parliament unopposed as Member for Liverpool at a by-election on 19 March 1756, but was defeated at the general election in 1761 by Sir William Meredith.

He was a Committee Member of the African Company of Merchants for Liverpool, 1758/9

References
 Mary M. Drummond, POLE, Charles (1695-1779), of Holcroft, Lancs. in The History of Parliament: the House of Commons 1754-1790 (1964).

1695 births
1779 deaths
British MPs 1754–1761
Members of the Parliament of Great Britain for Liverpool
English slave traders